This list contains all cultural property of national significance (class A) in the canton of Ticino from the 2009 Swiss Inventory of Cultural Property of National and Regional Significance. It is sorted by municipality and contains 150 individual buildings, 26 collections and 35 archaeological finds.

The geographic coordinates provided are in the Swiss coordinate system as given in the Inventory.

Acquarossa

Airolo

Alto Malcantone

Aranno

Arbedo-Castione

Arogno

Ascona

Astano

Avegno Gordevio

Balerna

Bedigliora

Bedretto

Bellinzona

Biasca

Bioggio

Bissone

Blenio

Bodio

Bosco/Gurin

Breggia

Brissago

Brusino Arsizio

Cademario

Campo

Capriasca

Caslano

Castel San Pietro

Centovalli

Cerentino

Cevio

Chiasso

Coldrerio

Collina d'Oro

Cugnasco-Gerra

Curio

Faido

Gambarogno

Giornico

Lavertezzo

Lavizzara

Ligornetto

Linescio

Locarno

Losone

Lugano

Maggia

Magliaso

Massagno

Mendrisio

Meride

Mezzovico-Vira

Miglieglia

Minusio

Monteceneri
 created on 21 November 2010 from Medeglia, Bironico, Camignolo, Rivera and Sigirino

Morbio Inferiore

Morcote

Muralto

Muzzano

Novazzano

Onsernone

Origlio

Orselina

Personico

Ponte Capriasca

Prato Leventina

Pura

Quinto

Riva San Vitale

Serravalle

Stabio

Terre di Pedemonte

Tresa

Val Mara

Verzasca

Vezia

References
 All entries, addresses and coordinates are from:

External links
 Swiss Inventory of Cultural Property of National and Regional Significance, 2009 edition:
PDF documents: Class A objects
PDF documents: Class B objects
Geographic information system